Vladimir Valeryevich Gazzayev (born 1 July 1980) is a Russian professional football coach and a former player.

Coaching career
From 2014 to 2015 he worked with the Kazakhstan Premier League club FC Aktobe.

From 26 June to 18 July 2018, Vladimir Gazzayev was the head coach of the new FC Urozhay Krasnodar.

On 31 December 2018, Gazzayev was appointed as the new manager of FC Tobol.

Personal life
He is the son of Valery Gazzaev.

Honours
Alania
 Russian National Football League: champions 2011–12

References

External links
 

1980 births
Sportspeople from Vladikavkaz
Living people
Russian footballers
Association football forwards
FC Spartak Vladikavkaz players
FC Tobol managers
Russian football managers
FC Spartak Vladikavkaz managers
FC Aktobe managers
FC Metalurgi Rustavi managers
FC Urozhay Krasnodar managers
Russian Premier League managers
Kazakhstan Premier League managers
Russian expatriate football managers
Expatriate football managers in Kazakhstan
Russian expatriate sportspeople in Kazakhstan
Expatriate football managers in Georgia (country)
Russian expatriate sportspeople in Georgia (country)
Expatriate football managers in Italy
Russian expatriate sportspeople in Italy